Volcán de Tindaya is a roll-on/roll-off passenger ferry operated by the Spanish shipping company Naviera Armas between the Canary Islands of Fuerteventura and Lanzarote in the Atlantic Ocean. It was built and delivered to Armas in 2003 and has been operating the route between the towns of Corralejo (Fuerteventura) and Playa Blanca (Lanzarote) since then. The ship is named after the Tindaya mountain on Fuerteventura.

Design and construction
Volcán de Tindaya was built in Vigo, Spain by Hijos de J. Barreras.

The vessel is powered by two main diesel engines, each capable of providing  of power, and two auxiliary diesel engines, each capable of providing  of power. The diesel engines drive two 315 rpm propellers. The ship also has two transverse 330 kW electrically driven bow thrusters.

Passengers are distributed over three decks and there is a single vehicle deck.

See also
Ships covering the same route
HSC Bocayna Express

References

External links 

Ferries of Spain
2003 ships
Lanzarote
Fuerteventura
Transport in the Canary Islands
Ships built in Spain